Platyarthridae is a family of woodlice, containing the following genera:
Cephaloniscus Ferrara & Taiti, 1989
Echinochaetus Ferrara & Schmalfuss, 1983
Gerufa Budde-Lund, 1909
Lanceochaetus Schmalfuss & Ferrara, 1978
Manibia Barnard, 1932
Niambia Budde-Lund, 1904
Papuasoniscus Vandel, 1973
Platyarthrus Brandt, 1833
Trichorhina Budde-Lund, 1908

They have no lungs on the pleopods, and have very small compound eyes, with fewer than 10 ommatidia. They are similar to members of the family Trachelipodidae, which do have pleopodal lungs, although the lungs can be inconspicuous.

See also

Trichorhina mulaiki (formerly Mexicostylus)

References

Woodlice
Crustacean families
Taxa named by Karl Wilhelm Verhoeff